John Håkansson (born 28 March 1998) is a Swedish footballer who most recently played for Kalmar FF.

Career
On 21 September 2014, when first-choice goalkeeper Ole Söderberg was suspended and second-choice goalkeeper Lars Cramer was sick, Håkansson broke a 79-year-old record when he became the youngest goalkeeper ever to play in Allsvenskan with 16 years, 5 months and 24 days when he played against Djurgårdens IF. He also became the first player born 1998 to play in Allsvenskan. However, Håkansson conceded 4 goals and Kalmar FF lost 4–0.

References

External links
 (archive)
 (archive)
John Håkansson at Fotbolltransfers

1998 births
Living people
Association football goalkeepers
Kalmar FF players
Åtvidabergs FF players
Swedish footballers
Allsvenskan players
Sweden youth international footballers